Maitland is an unincorporated community in McDowell County, West Virginia, United States.

History 
Maitland was named by a mine official for unknown reasons.

References

Unincorporated communities in McDowell County, West Virginia
Unincorporated communities in West Virginia